Aftab Uddin Howlader is a Jatiya Party (Ershad) politician and the former Member of Parliament of Khulna-3 and Bagerhat-3.

Career
Howlader was elected to parliament from Undivided Khulna-3 as a Bangladesh Nationalist Party candidate in 1979. He was elected to parliament from Bagerhat-3 as a Jatiya Party candidate in 1986 and 1988.

References

Jatiya Party politicians
Living people
3rd Jatiya Sangsad members
4th Jatiya Sangsad members
2nd Jatiya Sangsad members
Bangladesh Nationalist Party politicians
Year of birth missing (living people)